George Washington Carver National Monument is a unit of the National Park Service in Newton County, Missouri. The national monument was founded on July 14, 1943, by Franklin Delano Roosevelt, who dedicated $30,000 to the monument. It was the first national monument dedicated to an African American and first to a non-president.

The site preserves of the boyhood home of George Washington Carver, as well as the 1881 Moses Carver house and the Carver cemetery. His boyhood home consists of rolling hills, woodlands, and prairies. The  park has a -mile (1.2 km) nature trail, film, museum, and an interactive exhibit area for students.

The park is two miles west of Diamond along Missouri Route V and approximately ten miles southeast of Joplin.

It was listed on the National Register of Historic Places in 1966.

See also
 List of national monuments of the United States

References

External links 

 NPS web page for the site
 Photos of and information about the George Washington Carver National Monument 

National Park Service National Monuments in Missouri
Historic districts on the National Register of Historic Places in Missouri
Protected areas established in 1943
Carver, George Washington National Monument
African-American museums in Missouri
Museums in Newton County, Missouri
Protected areas of Newton County, Missouri
Parks in Missouri
Historic house museums in Missouri
1943 establishments in Missouri
African-American historic house museums
National Monument